Ana Roš (born 1972 in Šempeter pri Gorici) is a chef from Slovenia. A self-taught cook, she helms the kitchen of Hiša Franko restaurant in Kobarid, Slovenia.

Born to distinctly ambitious parents, she trained alpine skiing as a child, earning a place in the Yugoslavian youth national team, but later decided she didn't want a professional career. After that, she studied diplomacy in Gorizia, when she met her ex-partner Valter Kramar. Kramar's parents owned Hiša Franko, an already established restaurant. Incidentally, they decided to retire just as she completed her study, so she and Kramar decided to stay and take over the family restaurant (against the wish of her parents). At first, she worked as a waitress (Kramar became a sommelier) and tried convincing the then chef to try experimenting with traditional recipes, to no avail. After he left, she took over the kitchen.

With the help of her mother-in-law and a family friend, she shortly learned cooking well enough to attract attention in the wider region with her culinary creations. In 2010, she was featured in the Italian culinary magazine Identità Golose, which brought her even more attention. She began receiving invitations to top-notch culinary events, such as being a guest chef of the Ikarus restaurant in Hangar-7 in Salzburg, Austria, and the Gelinaz Grand Shuffle in New York City. In 2016, Roš was featured in the Netflix documentary Chef's Table and in early 2017, she was named world's best female chef by The World's 50 Best Restaurants academy.

Her cooking style features innovative remaking of traditional recipes from the upper Soča valley region, prepared with local ingredients. Roš characterizes her own approach as "technical, almost scientific." She has a preference of serving raw food, especially vegetables.

Recognition 
In 2016, Roš was featured in the Netflix documentary Chef's Table.

In 2017, she was named world's best female chef by The World's 50 Best Restaurants academy.

In 2019 Travel + Leisure named Hiša Franko one of the world's 30 best restaurants.

Hiša Franko was awarded two Michelin stars as Michelin Guide presented its first ever rating for Slovenia in 2020. In addition, her restaurant was specially noted for sustainability.

Personal life 
Roš and Kramar have two children, Eva Klara and Svit.

Apart from her native Slovene, she speaks English, Italian, French, Croatian, Spanish fluently and some German.

References 

1972 births
Living people
Slovenian chefs
Women chefs
Head chefs of Michelin starred restaurants